HMS M18  was a M15-class monitor built for the Royal Navy during the First World War.

Design
In addition to her 9.2-inch gun, she also possessed one 12 pounder and one six pound anti-aircraft gun. She was equipped with a four-shaft Bolinder two-cylinder semi-diesel engine with 640 horsepower that allowed a top speed of eleven knots. The monitor's crew consisted of sixty-nine officers and men.

Construction
HMS M18 ordered in March, 1915, as part of the War Emergency Programme of ship construction. She was laid down at the William Gray shipyard at Hartlepool in March 1915, launched on 15 May 1915, and completed in July 1915.

World War 1
M18 served in the Mediterranean from October 1915 to October 1918, and in the Baltic April to June 1919.

Disposal
M18 was sold on 29 January 1920 for mercantile service as an oil tanker and renamed 'Anam'.

References

Dittmar, F. J. & Colledge, J. J., "British Warships 1914–1919", (Ian Allan, London, 1972), 

 

M15-class monitors
1915 ships
World War I monitors of the United Kingdom
Royal Navy ship names